Sawlaram Lakshman Haldankar (1882–1968) aka S L Haldankar was a well-known Indian painter.

Early life
Haldankar was born into a family from Sawantwadi, which was then a Princely State and is located today in Maharashtra state. He showed early talent in the arts and this was noticed by the headmaster of his school in Sawantwadi. The headmaster commended the talented student to the Raja of this tiny state, who encouraged the young lad to develop his talents.

After Haldankar completed his schooling, the Raja gave him a scholarship to study at the Sir J.J. School of Art, Bombay. Haldankar duly enrolled and studied under the tutelage of famous artists Mahadev Vishwanath Dhurandhar and Cecil Leonard Burns. He soon distinguished himself by winning several prizes at a young age and exhibiting his work at several exhibitions. He was accomplished in both watercolors and oils, with a special mastery over portraits.

Career

After graduating from the J.J. School of Arts, Haldankar accepted a teaching job at the same institution and served there for some years. In 1908, he left the J.J. School of Art and founded the Haldankar Fine Arts' Institute in Bombay. Later, with some friends, he founded the Art Society of India in 1918 and became its first president. Many painters were trained by Haldankar, both at J.J. School of Art and at Haldankar Fine Arts' Institute.

Haldankar's works have been exhibited in Mumbai, Madras, Simla and the Royal Society of British Artists, London. He was awarded two commendation certificates by the Royal Society of British Artists. He was awarded the Governor's Prize by the British Government of Bombay Presidency in the years 1910, 1927 and 1932. After independence, S.L. Haldankar was felicitated by the President of India, Dr. Rajendra Prasad. He was also felicitated as a fellow of the Lalit Kala Akademi, New Delhi. An Italian encyclopedia (available at a library in Wai in Satara district of Maharashtra) ranks Haldankar as one of the three finest watercolorists in the world.

His works can be found in several prominent museums, including Prince of Wales Museum (Mumbai), National Gallery of Modern Art (New Delhi), National Gallery of Modern Art, Mumbai, Jaganmohan Palace Museum (Mysore), Moscow Academy of Art (Russia), Nagpur Museum (Nagpur) and Delhi Art Gallery. Perhaps his most famous painting is Glow of Hope, also known as Woman With the Lamp,  which is currently exhibited at Jaganmohan Palace in Mysore ( Karnataka State ). This painting is often incorrectly attributed to Raja Ravi Varma, however in fact it was  painted by Haldankar himself. The young girl in that painting is none other than his own daughter Gita Haldankar.

Personal life
As per Indian custom, Haldankar was married at a very young age to a lady of similar family and background, in a match arranged by their parents. The marriage was happy and conventional and was blessed with seven children, being four sons and three daughters. The four sons were Gajanan, Madhukar, Babanrao and Vijayanand (ordered by age). His eldest son Gajanan, better known as G. S. Haldankar, grew to be a renowned painter, and he specialized in watercolors. The third son, Babanrao Haldankar, is a noted classical singer. He had two daughters that are known today through the beautiful paintings he created. Gita Haldankar later known as Gita Uplekar was one of the three daughters. She was twelve when during Diwali when she was asked by "Bhau" his father to pose for the well known painting today known as Lady with Lamp under his Glow of Hope series. She lived till she was 102 in Kolhapur in 2018. She was married to Krishnakant Uplekar. The second daughter was also married in the Uplekar family to Govindrao Uplekar. She was originally known as Lilavati Haldankar and later as Lilavati Uplekar. Govindrao Uplekar was a freedom fighter who fought alongside Yeshwantrao Chauhan. Sawlaram Haldankar made another painting with his second daughter Lilavati known as the Divine Flame also under the same concept of Glow of Hope. These paintings were made in the same series of deriving glow from a central source like a lamp that throws dramatic shadows in the background and lights the face is a beautiful light. Lilavati had three sons Arun Uplekar, Shrikant Uplekar, and Anand Uplekar. Today Arun Uplekar's daughter Krupali Uplekar Krusche is a Professor of architecture and urban planning at the University of Notre Dame.

References

External links

Glow of Hope painting
Another incorrect attribution to Ravi Varma

1882 births
1968 deaths
Sir Jamsetjee Jeejebhoy School of Art alumni
Indian watercolourists
Indian portrait painters
20th-century Indian painters
Indian male painters
People from Sindhudurg district
Painters from Maharashtra
Bombay School
20th-century Indian male artists